The 1946 Washington Huskies football team was an American football team that represented the University of Washington in the Pacific Coast Conference (PCC) during the 1946 college football season. In its fifth season under head coach Ralph "Pest" Welch, the team compiled a 5–4 record (5–3 against PCC opponents), finished in fourth place in the PCC, and outscored its opponents by a total of 144 to 140. 

Guard "Pappy" John Zeger was elected as the honorary team captain. Halfback Freddy Provo, who suffered severe shrapnel wounds in World War II, won the award as the team's most inspirational player. Two Washington players received first-team honors from the Associated Press (AP) or United Press (UP) on the 1946 All-Pacific Coast football team: Zegar at guard and Dick Hagen at end.

Schedule

Personnel

Players

 Hjalmer Anderson, end
 Gerry Austin, quarterback
 George Bayer, tackle
 Gordon Berlin, center
 Gail Bruce, end
 Wes Carlson, guard
 Chuck Coatney, tackle
 Marshall Dallas, fullback
 Carl Fennema, center
 Pete Foster, tackle
 Dick Hagen, end
 Herb Harlow, halfback
 Alf Hemstad, quarterback
 Gordon Hungar, halfback
 Bruce Jaton, center
 Whitey King, halfback
 Bob Levenhagen, guard
 Bill McGovern, center
 Hank Melusky, end
 George Meyers, guard
 Bob Mikalson, fullback
 Bob Nelson, end
 Fred Osterhout, guard
 Dick Ottele, quarterback
 Fred Provo, halfback
 Harry Rice, tackle
 Sam Robinson, halfback
 Ernie Stein, end
 Dmitri Tadich, tackle
 Jim Thompson, quarterback
 Jack Tracy, end
 Dick Watson, guard
 Arnie Weinmeister, fullback
 John Zeger, guard

Coaching staff
 Head coach: Ralph "Pest" Welch
 Assistant coaches: Roy Sandberg (assistant coach), Red Badgro (end coach), Art McLarney (assistant coach), Johnny Cherberg (backfield coach), Bill Haroldson (line coach)

Professional football draft selections
Four University of Washington Huskies were selected in the 1947 NFL Draft, which lasted 32 rounds with 300 selections.  One of those Huskies was also selected in the 1947 AAFC Draft, which lasted 25 rounds with 186 selections.

References

External links
 Official game program: Washington at Washington State – October 12, 1946

Washington
Washington Huskies football seasons
Washington Huskies football